Gerald Sharp (27 October 1865 – 30 August 1933) was an English-born Anglican clergyman, Archbishop of Brisbane 1921–1933.

Early life 
Sharp was born at Childer Thornton,
Cheshire, England, the son of Thomas Blatt Sharp, a merchant, and his wife, Mary Anne, née Lillee. Sharp was educated at Manchester Grammar School and St John's College, Cambridge, with a scholarship in 1883, and graduated B.A. in 1886 with honours in classics.

Religious life 
Sharp entered Lincoln Theological College in 1888, and was ordained deacon in 1889 and priest in 1890. He was a curate of Rowbarton 1889-93 and at Hammersmith, London (1893–98), became vicar of Whitkirk, Yorkshire, in 1898, and in 1909 was proctor of convocation, Archdeaconry of Ripon. Sharp was consecrated Bishop of New Guinea on 25 April 1910.

He attended the Lambeth conference in 1920; in 1921 he was elected Archbishop of Brisbane in succession to Archbishop St Clair Donaldson. He was enthroned at St John's Cathedral, Brisbane, on 16 November 1921. Sharp was a missionary bishop, much interested in social work.

He was involved in many movements for the good of his church and the state. He was a member of the University of Queensland senate from 1923 and was several times president of the Brisbane branch of the League of Nations Union. Sharp was president of the Royal Geographical Society of Queensland.

He attended the Lambeth conference in 1930 and in 1933 was acting Primate of Australia.

Later life 
Sharp never married.

He died of renal failure while still in office on 30 August 1933 and was buried in Toowong Cemetery. 

Sharp's Roman Catholic counterpart, the long-serving archbishop James Duhig, considered Sharp "the most lovable man I knew".

References

1859 births
1924 deaths
Australian Anglican missionaries
Anglican archbishops of Brisbane
People educated at Manchester Grammar School
Alumni of St John's College, Cambridge
Anglican bishops of New Guinea
Burials at Toowong Cemetery
Alumni of Lincoln Theological College